Joonas Valkonen (born June 3, 1993) is a Finnish professional ice hockey defenceman. He is currently playing with Tingsryds AIF in the Swedish HockeyAllsvenskan.

Valkonen made his SM-liiga debut playing with Espoo Blues during the 2011–12 SM-liiga season. He has also played for Vaasan Sport and Mikkelin Jukurit.

References

External links

1993 births
Living people
Finnish ice hockey defencemen
Espoo Blues players
Iisalmen Peli-Karhut players
Jokipojat players
Kiekko-Vantaa players
KooKoo players
Mikkelin Jukurit players
Peliitat Heinola players
Sportspeople from Vantaa
Starbulls Rosenheim players
Tingsryds AIF players
Vaasan Sport players